Kaiya is a genus of Australian large-clawed spiders that was first described by Raymond Robert Forster, Norman I. Platnick & Michael R. Gray in 1987.

Species
 it contains four species:
Kaiya bemboka Gray, 1987 – Australia (New South Wales)
Kaiya brindabella (Moran, 1985) – Australian Capital Territory
Kaiya parnabyi Gray, 1987 – Australia (Victoria)
Kaiya terama Gray, 1987 (type) – Australia (New South Wales)

References

Araneomorphae genera
Gradungulidae
Taxa named by Raymond Robert Forster